Rosewood Heights is an unincorporated community and census-designated place (CDP) in Madison County, Illinois, United States. The population was 3,971 at the 2020 census. It is part of the Metro East region of the Greater St. Louis metropolitan area.

Geography
Rosewood Heights is located in northwestern Madison County at  (38.891414, -90.071813). It is bordered to the east by Bethalto, to the south by Wood River, to the west by East Alton, and to the north by Cottage Hills.

Illinois Routes 111 and 140 (West MacArthur Drive) form the northern border of the CDP. IL 140 leads west  to Alton and east through Bethalto  to Hamel, while IL 111 leads northwest  to Godfrey and south  to the center of Wood River. Illinois Route 255, a four-lane expressway, runs along the east edge of Rosewood Heights, with access from Exit 10 (IL 111-140). IL 255 leads south  to Interstates 255 and 270 and northwest  to its end at U.S. Route 67 in Godfrey.

The community drains northwest toward the East Fork of the Wood River, which joins the Mississippi River at East Alton.

Demographics
At the 2000 census there were 4,262 people, 1,688 households, and 1,299 families living in the CDP. The racial makeup of the CDP was 98.78% White, 0.12% African American, 0.23% Native American, 0.21% Asian, 0.21% from other races, and 0.45% from two or more races. Hispanic or Latino of any race were 0.82%.

Of the 1,688 households 29.7% had children under the age of 18 living with them, 64.5% were married couples living together, 9.1% had a female householder with no husband present, and 23.0% were non-families. 20.0% of households were one person and 10.4% were one person aged 65 or older. The average household size was 2.52 and the average family size was 2.88.

The age distribution was 22.2% under the age of 18, 7.6% from 18 to 24, 26.1% from 25 to 44, 26.0% from 45 to 64, and 18.1% 65 or older. The median age was 41 years. For every 100 females, there were 90.6 males. For every 100 females age 18 and over, there were 90.5 males.

The median household income was $46,701 and the median family income  was $53,365. Males had a median income of $44,111 versus $28,176 for females. The per capita income for the CDP was $20,527. About 7.2% of families and 7.8% of the population were below the poverty line, including 8.4% of those under age 18 and 3.2% of those age 65 or over.

References

Census-designated places in Madison County, Illinois
Census-designated places in Illinois